The 1992 Texas General Election was held on November 3, 1992, in the U.S. state of Texas. Voters statewide elected the U.S. President, Railroad Commissioner. Statewide judicial offices up for election were three justices of the Texas Supreme Court and three judges of the Texas Court of Criminal 
Appeals.

The United States House of Representatives elections in Texas, 1992 were conducted as part of the Texas General Election.

United States President

Railroad Commissioner

Legislative Elections

Texas Senate

Districts 1-5

Districts 6-10

Districts 11-15

Districts 16-20

Districts 21-25

Districts 26-31

Texas House of Representatives

Texas Supreme Court

Justice, Place 1

Justice, Place 2

Justice, Place 3

Texas Court of Criminal Appeals

Judge, Place 1

Judge, Place 2

Judge, Place 3

State Board of Education
Only contested elections are listed.

Member, State Board of Education, District 4

Member, State Board of Education, District 5

Member, State Board of Education, District 8

Member, State Board of Education, District 9

Member, State Board of Education, District 11

Member, State Board of Education, District 13

Court of Appeals
Only contested elections are listed.

First Court of Appeals

Second Court of Appeals

Fourth Court of Appeals

Fifth Court of Appeals

Seventh Court of Appeals

Eight Court of Appeals

Fourteenth Court of Appeals

References